Kessleria alpicella is a moth of the  family Yponomeutidae. It is found in Germany, Poland, the Czech Republic, Slovakia, Austria, Switzerland, Italy and most of the Balkan Peninsula.

The length of the forewings is 7–9 mm for males and 7.3-7.6 mm for females. The forewings are white with light brown accents. The hindwings are grey. Adults are on wing from the end of May to the end of July.

The larvae feed on Saxifraga paniculata and Saxifraga rotundifolia. They mine the leaves of their host plant. The mine initially has the form of a narrow, full depth corridor with dispersed frass. Later, several full depth blotches are made. Pupation takes place outside of the mine. The larvae have a green body and light brown head. They can be found in November.

References

Moths described in 1851
Yponomeutidae
Moths of Europe